Dimuth Akalanka Peiris also known as Dimuth Peiris (born 11 January 2000) is a Sri Lankan male swimmer and a national record holder in swimming. He represented Sri Lanka at the 2018 Commonwealth Games and competed in swimming competitions. In August 2018, he became the first ever Sri Lankan student to sit for a Sri Lankan GCE A/L examinations outside Sri Lanka as he was granted special permission to write A/L exams in Jakarta, Indonesia just prior to his preparations for the 2018 Asian Games. He represented Sri Lanka at the 2018 Summer Youth Olympics in October 2018 which was held in Argentina. He also went onto represent Sri Lanka at the 2019 World Aquatics Championships as the only male swimmer.

Career 
Akalanka Peiris has set national swimming records in 50m backstroke, 100m backstroke and 4×100m freestyle relay events. In 2017, he set the new Sri Lankan national record in men's 100m backstroke event.

He later claimed two more national records in both 50m backstroke and 4×100m freestyle relay events during the 2018 Commonwealth Games.

2018 Asian Games 
Akalanka Peiris also qualified to represent Sri Lanka at the 2018 Asian Games when he was on the verge of his A/L examinations. However he was approved by the Ministry of Education of Sri Lanka to take three of his A/L papers to Jakarta and was allowed to sit for the exams in the Sri Lanka embassy in Jakarta. This instance also made him the only Sri Lankan to sit for the A/L examinations in a foreign country. Due to his examinations, he missed out to take part in the opening ceremony of the 2018 Asian Games.

2018 Summer Youth Olympics
Peiris was the only Sri Lankan swimmer to qualify to represent Sri Lanka at the 2018 Summer Youth Olympics.

References 

2000 births
Living people
Sri Lankan male swimmers
Swimmers at the 2018 Commonwealth Games
Swimmers at the 2022 Commonwealth Games
Swimmers at the 2018 Asian Games
Commonwealth Games competitors for Sri Lanka
Swimmers from Colombo
Swimmers at the 2018 Summer Youth Olympics
Asian Games competitors for Sri Lanka
South Asian Games medalists in swimming
South Asian Games gold medalists for Sri Lanka
South Asian Games silver medalists for Sri Lanka
South Asian Games bronze medalists for Sri Lanka